The Copa del Rey de Baloncesto 2012–13 was the 77th edition of the Spanish King's Basketball Cup. It is managed by the ACB League and was held in Vitoria-Gasteiz, in the Fernando Buesa Arena on February 7–10, 2013. FC Barcelona Regal was the champion.

Qualified teams
The seven first qualified after the first half of the ACB Regular Season will qualify to the tournament. As Caja Laboral, host team, finished between the seven first teams, the eight qualified will join the Copa del Rey.

Draw
The draw will be held in Vitoria-Gasteiz on January 14, 2013. The first four qualified teams are in the Pot 1 and will face each one with the other four qualified teams. There are no restrictions for the draw of the semifinals.

As new, the first qualified team played its game on Thursday.

Bracket

Quarterfinals

Semifinals

Final

References and notes

External links
2013 Copa del Rey official website

Copa del Rey de Baloncesto
2012–13 in Spanish basketball cups